Stuart Davies (born 2 September 1965) is a former  international rugby union player.

Davies was born in Swansea.  A back row forward, he played his club rugby for Swansea RFC and attained 17 caps for Wales.

A neck injury sustained in the 1998 Five Nations Championship match against France forced Davies to end his career as a rugby player.

Following his retirement, Davies has appeared as a rugby commentator and summariser for BBC and also worked for Gwalia Housing Association. In February 2015, Davies was appointed as chief executive of the Newport Gwent Dragons regional rugby team.

Notes

Welsh rugby union players
Wales international rugby union players
1965 births
Rugby union players from Swansea
Swansea RFC players
Barbarian F.C. players
Living people
Rugby union number eights